The William F. Meggers Award has been awarded annually since 1970 by the Optical Society (originally called the Optical Society of America) for outstanding contributions to spectroscopy.

Recipients

Source:

See also

 List of physics awards

References

Awards of Optica (society)
Spectroscopy